Kuty ( translit. Kuty,  translit. Kitev) is an urban-type settlement in Ukraine, on the Cheremosh river, in the Kosiv Raion of Ivano-Frankivsk Oblast. It is one of the historical centres of the ancient region of Pokuttya, whose name derives from the township. The current population estimate is  Kuty hosts the administration of Kuty territorial community, one of the hromadas of Ukraine, which consists of Kuty township and 6 villages.

History
Kuty, which means "angles" or "corners" in Ukrainian, was first mentioned in records of 1469 as a village in the estate of Jan Odrowąż, then Polish archbishop of Lwów (now Lviv) and personal adviser to several Polish kings. Over time the settlement grew and in 1715 at the request of Jan Potocki, the voivod of Kiev, King Augustus II the Strong granted it a town charter. Two churches were founded for local Uniates and Armenians. With expansion and the proximity of Bukovina, the town became the seat of a starost in the region of Halych and an administrative centre within the Ruthenian Voivodship of the Polish–Lithuanian Commonwealth.

The town was the Fiefdom of the Potocki family until the partitions of Poland. In 1772 it came under Austrian administration and on May 1, 1782 Kuty lost its town privileges. As a result, its economic growth halted and Kuty remained a provincial backwater inhabited mostly by Jewish and Armenian merchants. Around 1850 the town was linked to the rest of Galicia by the Kołomyja-Czerniowce railway. However, as both Galicia and Bukovina were under Austrian rule, it could not capitalize on its status as a border town. From the 19th-century onwards, Kuty acquired fame as a holiday resort owing to its picturesque location, on a river surrounded by hills and blessed with a balmy climate. It was known as a fruit-growing area and associated festivals. It was home to the largest Armenian community in Poland, many of whom had settled there from Moldova.

After the collapse of the Central Powers in 1918 the town was briefly under the control of the West Ukrainian People's Republic. After seizure by Romania Kuty returned to newly independent Polish administration. It became the most important border crossings between Poland and Romania. In 1930 the Polish Army built a new wooden bridge across the Cheremosh river. 

It was in Kuty that the Polish president, Ignacy Mościcki, spent his last days in Poland before crossing the border into exile during the 1939 Polish Defensive War against the Germans and the Soviets attacking on two fronts. The town was defended by the Polish Army until September 20, 1939. Among the last soldiers to be killed by the Red Army in heavy fighting for the bridge was the notable Polish writer, Tadeusz Dołęga-Mostowicz. Except for the term of German occupation between 1941 and 1944, Kuty was annexed by the USSR in 1939 and was administered by Soviet Ukraine. In the spring of 1944 Ukrainian nationalists killed about 200 Poles and Armenians. 

Since 1991 Kuty has been part of independent Ukraine.

Jewish community
In the spring of 1942 during the German occupation, the entire Jewish population of Kuty was killed by the Nazis. Many died in the town while the rest were rounded up and deported to the ghetto in Chernivtsi. Only a handful survived.

Demography
In 1849 the town had roughly 3,700 inhabitants, in 1880, 6,300 and in the late 1920s – 8,000. Of these 3,300 were Jews, 1,900 Hutsuls, 1,300 Poles and over 500 Armenians.
In 2001, the population was 4,272, and in 2016 ca. .

Notable residents
 Edmund Charaszkiewicz (1895-1975), Polish intelligence officer
 Eliasz Kuziemski (1922–2000), Polish actor
 Vira Vovk (1926-2022), Ukrainian writer
 Abraham Gershon of Kitov (1701-1761), rabbi
 Haim Drukman (1932-2022), rabbi and educator, Israeli politician
 Levko Dutkovskiy (born 1943), musician and composer, founder and leader of the vocal-instrumental ensemble "Smerichka" which included legendary artists Volodymyr Ivasyuk, Nazariy Yaremchuk and Vasyl Zinkevych. People's Artist of Ukraine, director, teacher, one of the founders of Ukrainian pop music.

References

Further reading 
 PolishRoots Geography&Maps (the fifth entry)
 A historical outline of the Jewish Community of Kuty
 Kuty Jewish Cemetery fully documented at Jewish Galicia and Bukovina ORG

External links 
 

Urban-type settlements in Kosiv Raion
Ruthenian Voivodeship
Stanisławów Voivodeship
Holocaust locations in Poland